Skyrunning is a sport of mountain running up to or exceeding  where the minimum average incline is 6% over the total distance and at least 5% has an incline of 30% or more. The climbing difficulty does not exceed II grade UIAA. Poles, crampons, and hands may be used to aid progress. The governing body is the International Skyrunning Federation. The sport comprises a number of different disciplines from the short, steep Vertical Kilometer to the more popular SkyRace and SkyMarathon. Ultra SkyMarathons are becoming increasingly popular as are short vertical SkySpeed races which include skyscraper racing.

History 
The idea of skyrunning came from Italian mountaineer Marino Giacometti and a handful of fellow climbers. They pioneered races on Mont Blanc and Monte Rosa in the early 1990s. In 1993, with the support of the Fila sportswear company, skyrunning took off across the world's mountain ranges reaching from the Alps to the Himalayas, to Mount Kenya and the Mexican volcanoes. 

In 1995, the Federation for Sport at Altitude was founded to address the need for rules to govern the sport and generally manage this fast-growing discipline, which today counts some 200 races worldwide with around 50,000 participants from 65 countries.

A peculiar feature of the first 10 years of the Skyrunning history was the study of the limits of human performance at high
altitudes, through the Peak Performance Project, coordinated by Dr. Giulio Sergio Roi, which involved several researchers and has led to the publication of numerous scientific articles.

International Skyrunning Federation

Today, the sport is managed by the International Skyrunning Federation, formed in 2008 by the board and members of the FSA and founding nations. The principal aims of the ISF are the direction, regulation, promotion, development, and furtherance of skyrunning and similar multisport activities on a worldwide basis. ISF sanctions the Skyrunner World Series.

Skyrunning disciplines
The three main disciplines are Sky, SkyUltra, and Vertical. Those are the disciplines contested at the Skyrunning World Championships and Skyrunning Continental Championships. More disciplines are under the ISF regulations:

Skyrunning competitions

 Skyrunning World Championships
Annual world championship.

 Skyrunning European Championships
Annual European championship.

 Skyrunner World Series
Annual world cup, launched in 2004, has grown to represent the peak of outdoor running defined by a vertical climb, altitude, and technical difficulty.

 VK Open Championships
Annual cup to promote the Vertical discipline and highlight the Vertical Kilometer® skyrunning discipline.

See also
 Mountain running
 Mountaineering
 Trail running
 Ultramarathon

References

External links
 International Skyrunning Federation website

 
Running by type
Types of Mountaineering
Long-distance running